The 1971–72 Iowa State Cyclones men's basketball team represented Iowa State University during the 1971–72 NCAA Division I men's basketball season. The Cyclones were coached by Maury John, who was in his first season with the Cyclones. They played their home games at Hilton Coliseum in Ames, Iowa. Hilton Coliseum hosted its first Iowa State men's basketball game on December 2, a 71–54 win over Arizona.

They finished the season 12–14, 5–9 in Big Eight play to finish in sixth place.

Roster

Schedule and results 

|-
!colspan=6 style=""|Regular Season

|-

References 

Iowa State Cyclones men's basketball seasons
Iowa State
Iowa State Cyc
Iowa State Cyc